Les chuchoteuses (English: "The Gossipers") is a 2002 bronze outdoor sculpture by Rose-Aimée Bélanger installed along Montreal's Rue Saint-Paul, in Quebec, Canada, owned by La Société de développement commercial du Vieux-Montréal.

References

External links

 

2002 establishments in Canada
2002 sculptures
Bronze sculptures in Canada
Old Montreal
Outdoor sculptures in Montreal
Sculptures of women in Canada
Statues in Canada